Dún Fearbhaí is a stone ringfort (cashel) and National Monument located on Inishmaan, one of the Aran Islands, Ireland.

Location
Dún Fearbhaí is located on the eastern edge of Inishmaan, facing back toward Galway Bay.

History
The fort is believed to date from the 1st millennium AD, some placing it around the 9th century. Its rectilinear shape and unusual structure have led to the belief that it is later than the other Aran Islands forts like Dún Conor, and perhaps contemporary with Dún Formna on Inisheer.

The name Dún Mur is believed to have the same derivation as the Cliffs of Moher, which are named after an old promontory fort called Moher, which once stood on Hag's Head. The name Dún Fearbhaí takes its name from the surrounding area An Fhearbach, "abounding in cattle."

Description
Dún Fearbhaí is a stone ringfort (cashel) shaped like a square with rounded corners; it contains two walls and one terrace built on a steep incline, and also four sets of internal stairs. O’Driscoll wrote, "A thick wall would have been necessary for larger, higher walls, resulting in excessive labour and resource costs. This was partly alleviated by terracing the walls, reducing the amount of material used. Terracing of the inner face and incorporation of steps allowed access to the top of the wall, permitting occupants expansive visibility of the immediate environs as well as a strategic advantage over approaching attackers. The vertical walls that met attackers or visitors would have been an impressive barrier that provided practical defence for the occupants, as well status."

References

Aran Islands
National Monuments in County Galway
Archaeological sites in County Galway